Putnam City High School (commonly, PC, Putnam City Original, and PCO)  is a secondary school located in Warr Acres, Oklahoma, a northwestern suburb of metropolitan Oklahoma City, U.S.. It is one of three high schools in the Putnam City School District and serves more than 1,900 students. It is accredited by the North Central Association of Secondary Schools.

The current school site was founded in 1958 and includes the primary stadium for the Putnam City School District.

History
Putnam City High School's first graduating class had only three students in 1919. The school's current site on Northwest 50th Street was opened in 1958.

Campus
Located at Northwest 50th Street and Ann Arbor Avenue, the school's campus includes a separate building for the instruction of science and history, a large student parking lot and the district's primary stadium used by three high schools for football, track meets and other outdoor activities. The school has two band rooms, two cafeterias and two gymnasiums.

The school district is roughly bounded by Northwest 39th Street on the south, Northwest Expressway on the north, Portland Avenue on the east and County Line Road on the west.

Marching Contest
The Putnam City School District hosts a marching band contest, known as The Putnam City Marching Classic, annually at Putnam City High School.

Notable alumni
Alvan Adams, former professional basketball player (Oklahoma, Phoenix Suns)
Bill Amis, professional basketball player (Pratt CC, Hawaii, Univ. of Tartu, Keravnos, Steaua București)
Joe Aska, professional American football player (Central Oklahoma, Oakland Raiders, Indianapolis Colts, New York/New Jersey Hitmen)
Nicole DeHuff, TV/movie actress (Meet the Parents, The Court)
Stephen Dickson, opera singer
Andrew Heaney, MLB pitcher for the Texas Rangers
C.J. Henry, professional baseball player (New York Yankees, Philadelphia Phillies), college basketball player (Memphis, Kansas, Southern Nazarene)
Xavier Henry, professional basketball player for the Kansas Jayhawks and the New Orleans Hornets
Phil Johnson, basketball head coach (Northern Oklahoma CC, Seminole JC, San Jose State) basketball assistant coach (East Central, Tulsa, New Orleans, Arizona, Chicago Bulls, USC, UTEP)
Steve Largent, Pro Football Hall of Famer (Tulsa, Houston Oilers, Seattle Seahawks); former congressman
Bryan McCann, professional American football player (SMU, Dallas Cowboys, Baltimore Ravens, Oakland Raiders, Miami Dolphins, Arizona Cardinals, Washington Redskins)
Joseph Opala, public historian, Africa scholar, human rights activist
Ed Roberts - poet
Pat Ryan, former college (University of Tennessee) and NFL football player (New York Jets and Philadelphia Eagles)
Bob Shirley, Major League Baseball pitcher
Christopher Wise, scholar and professor of English and Comparative Literature at Western Washington University

References 

Public high schools in Oklahoma
Educational institutions established in 1915
Schools in Oklahoma County, Oklahoma
1915 establishments in Oklahoma